Black Oak is a community in White River Township, Washington County, Arkansas, United States. It is located between Greenland and Elkins and lies six miles southeast of Fayetteville.

The community lies along the west bank of the Middle Fork of the White River. The community of Sulphur City lies on the east bank of the river approximately 1.5 mile to the southeast.

References

Unincorporated communities in Washington County, Arkansas
Unincorporated communities in Arkansas